James McMahon is an American amateur astronomer, acknowledged for his visual observations of asteroid occultations. In 1978 his observation of the occultation of the asteroid 532 Herculina with the star SAO 120774, together with photometric study made at the Lowell Observatory, was considered a proof of the existence of a Herculina's natural satellite, which would be the first discovery of an asteroid moon in history. However, a 1993 Hubble Space Telescope observation failed to confirm the discovery. In 1979 James McMahon was the first person awarded with the newly established Amateur Achievement Award of the Astronomical Society of the Pacific.

References

External links
Meta Research - The NEAR Challenge
Amateur Achievement Award winners

Amateur astronomers
20th-century American astronomers
Living people
Year of birth missing (living people)